Hawu may be,

Mount Hawu
Hawu language